The Toro Rosso STR9 is a Formula One racing car designed by Scuderia Toro Rosso to compete in the 2014 Formula One season. It was driven by Jean-Éric Vergne and 2013 GP3 Series champion Daniil Kvyat, who replaced Daniel Ricciardo after Ricciardo moved to Red Bull Racing. The STR9 was the first Toro Rosso car to use an engine built by Renault, the Energy F1-2014. The Toro Rosso STR9 was also the first Italian-licensed F1 car to use Renault engines since the Benetton B201 in 2001.

Complete Formula One results
(key)

Notes

References

Toro Rosso STR9
2014 Formula One season cars